Hossein Erfani Parsaei was an Iranian voice actor who is known for Persian voice-dubbing of foreign films.

Career

Voice acting 

Hossein Erfani started his career as a voice actor at the Moulin Rouge Studio in Tehran in 1961. He is known for dubbing over Humphrey Bogart roles  in Maltese Falcon or Casablanca and Clark Gable role as Rhett Butler From Gone with the Wind. He has also dubbed over some of Orson Welles, Marlon Brando, Charlton Heston, Gene Hackman, Toshiro Mifune, William Holden, Morgan freeman and Arnold Schwarzenegger's voice roles in films they starred in. He has also dubbed over Iranian actors such as Bahman Mofid's role in Dash Akol Movie, Faramarz Gharibian's role in The Deer and Jahangir Forouhar's role in Daie Jan Napoleon Iranian Television serial in the 1970s.

Acting career 
Erfani began his acting career in 1974, playing a role in “Bitter and Sweet”, a popular TV serial directed by Mansur Purmand. He was also known for Hormat-e Rafigh (1977) and Sim-e Khardar (1981).

Radio 
Erfani worked with voice actor and director Manuchehr Nozari in "Friday morning with you" and other radio programs  in 1980s.

References

External links 
بیوگرافی زنده‌یاد حسین عرفانی
گفت‌وگوی منتشرنشده از آقای دوبله ایران

Iranian male film actors
Iranian male television actors
Iranian male voice actors
1942 births
2018 deaths
Male actors from Tehran